Mohari Kalan is a village in Gosainganj block of Lucknow district, Uttar Pradesh, India. As of 2011, its population is 1,801, in 350 households. It is the seat of a gram panchayat.

See also 
 Mohari Khurd

References 

Villages in Lucknow district